Donald D. Lapre (May 19, 1964 – October 2, 2011) was an American multi-level marketing and infomercial salesman. His work involved product packages such as "The Greatest Vitamin in the World" and "Making Money Secrets".

Lapre was criticized as selling questionable business plans that often did not work for his clients. In June 2011, Lapre was charged with 41 counts of conspiracy, mail fraud, wire fraud, and promotional money laundering related to his Internet businesses. He was arrested on June 24, 2011, for failing to appear in court to face these charges.

He died on October 2, 2011, while in jail awaiting  trial. The autopsy report stated that he died of blood loss after cutting his throat with a razor blade.

Business ventures
Born in Providence, Rhode Island, Lapre moved to Phoenix, Arizona with his family when he was a child. He married Sally Redondo in 1988. A high-school dropout, Lapre, together with his wife, started a credit repair business called Unknown Concepts in 1990. Lapre then began selling a 36-page booklet explaining how to recover a Federal Housing Administration insurance refund after paying off a home mortgage. He also began offering "900" phone lines. On TV infomercials in the early–mid 1990s, he claimed that by placing "tiny classified ads" in newspapers he was "able to make $50,000 a week from [his] tiny one-bedroom apartment".

In 1992, Lapre began broadcasting The Making Money Show with Don Lapre, which suggested that viewers could make money as easily as he had. For several years the show was ranked among the 10 most frequently broadcast cable television infomercials.  The principal product was Lapre's "Money Making Secrets", a package of booklets, tapes, and common-sense tips for placing ads and operating a 900-number business. The product was sold through New Strategies, whose parent company was Tropical Beaches.

He later began broadcasting infomercials for "The Greatest Vitamin in the World".  In 2005, the Food and Drug Administration (FDA) warned Lapre about claims his vitamins were intended as a drug for diseases such as diabetes, stroke, heart disease, insomnia, cancer, and arthritis. The FDA stated "[his] products [were] not generally recognized as safe and effective for the above referenced conditions." In 2006, the FDA again warned Lapre about untruthful claims.

Charges
According to a June 15, 2011, Associated Press article, Lapre was indicted by a federal grand jury in Phoenix, Arizona, on June 8, 2011, on accusations of running a nationwide scheme to sell worthless Internet businesses. Federal prosecutors accused Lapre of bilking more than 220,000 victims out of nearly $52 million. He was charged with 41 counts of conspiracy, mail fraud, wire fraud, promotional money laundering, and transactional money laundering. A federal judge issued a bench warrant for Lapre on June 22, 2011, after he failed to appear at his arraignment.

On June 27, 2011, Lapre was arrested in Tempe, Arizona, at a Life Time Fitness center, where he had reportedly lived for two days, with serious self-inflicted knife wounds to his groin.  The wounds led authorities to believe Lapre had attempted suicide while at Life Time Fitness by attempting to sever the femoral artery in his legs.

Death
Lapre died on October 2, 2011, while in jail awaiting his trial, which was scheduled to begin on October 4, 2011. The autopsy report stated that he died of massive blood loss after cutting his throat with a razor blade and had wrapped himself in sheets to conceal the massive blood loss from anyone who might try to save him.

In popular culture

David Spade appeared in two sketches parodying Don Lapre on Saturday Night Live.
John C. McGinley played Dick Dupre, a spoof of Don Lapre and his astrologer Melissa Lipnutz, in the film Puff, Puff, Pass.

References

1964 births
2011 suicides
American television personalities
Consumer fraud
Infomercials
People who committed suicide in prison custody
Businesspeople from Providence, Rhode Island
Television personalities from Phoenix, Arizona
American salespeople
Suicides by sharp instrument in the United States
Suicides in Arizona
American people who died in prison custody
Prisoners who died in United States federal government detention
American confidence tricksters
20th-century American businesspeople